Boa Viagem is a neighborhood in Recife, Pernambuco in the wealthy southern zone of the municipality. The neighborhood has one of the most visited beaches in Northeastern Brazil, Boa Viagem beach.

However, the beach is plagued by tiger shark attacks since Suape port was built in the 1990s, thought to have disrupted the sharks' behavior. Pina, Recife and Piedade, Jaboatão are the neighboring beaches.

The district is a center of the city's social life. Boa Viagem is also home to Shopping Rio Mar, a high-end shopping center located along the coast of the river Capibaribe.

Boa Viagem had a human development index in 2000 with 0.964, rivalling that of some Scandinavian countries, Japan, and Canada.

The neighborhood is near the Recife International Airport.

References

Beaches of Brazil
Neighbourhoods of Recife
Landforms of Pernambuco
Tourist attractions in Pernambuco